Kirby's Company is an Australian television drama series which first screened on the ABC in 1977. It follows the story of three generations of males in the Kirby family. It was written by Don Catchlove and directed by David Cahill.

References

External links
Kirby's Company at National Film and Sound Archive

Australian Broadcasting Corporation original programming
Australian drama television series
1977 Australian television series debuts
1977 Australian television series endings